Leigh James Wood (born 21 May 1983 in Selby, England) is an English footballer, who plays for Selby Town FC after leaving Harrogate Town. He is at home anywhere in the centre of defence or midfield.

Leigh was released by York City in May 2004. He later joined Harrogate Town. He left the club in June 2008.

Notes

External links 
 
 

1983 births
Living people
People from Selby
English footballers
Association football midfielders
York City F.C. players
Harrogate Town A.F.C. players
English Football League players
Footballers from Yorkshire